Campfire Legends  is a casual adventure game trilogy, developed by GameHouse Studios Eindhoven, and published by GameHouse.

Games

Campfire Legends: The Hookman

The story of the game is based on that of the urban legend of The Hook, told by a group of girls telling  scary stories around a campfire.

As they tell the story of The Hookman, the player takes the role of Christine, a young woman who has a romantic getaway planned for her and her boyfriend Patrick. When she arrives at the cabin of her parents, the lights are out. After fixing window shutters and replacing fuses, she finds the whole house has been ransacked.

Christine hears on the radio news that an assassin known as the Hookman has escaped, and calls the police to report the break-in at her parents' cabin. The policeman is rude and tells her it will take a few hours to get to her. When her boyfriend Patrick arrives, he dismisses her fears about the serial killer, and drives the two of them to the lake for a romantic campfire. Patrick disappears to get firewood, then cocoa. While he is gone, someone damages the car. Christine sets out to repair it and search for Patrick.

She discovers that her father and a fellow scientist (who lost his family in tragic accidents) from Stillwater Sanatorium were working on a formula that regenerates dead tissue. Christine frees the trapped spirits of his family members, but he appears and tries to kill her.

The game was released on October 14, 2009.

Campfire Legends: The Babysitter

The group of girls at the campfire from The Hookman continue listening to the narrator's stories. This story stars a young woman named Lisa, sometime in the mid-1980s. She has agreed to babysit a teacher's young twins overnight in hopes of getting a letter of recommendation for college. As the parents leave the mother tells her one of the girls, Libby, has a rare skin disease, so that Lisa is startled when she sees her.

Lisa settles down, but the girls are not as asleep as the mother thought. They come downstairs and have very different reactions to Lisa. Libby wants Lisa to leave, but her sister Maggie, seems more than pleased to have Lisa watching them and demands hot chocolate, from scratch, the way her mom makes it.

After giving the girls their cups and sending them back to bed, Lisa tries to wind down before studying. Only to hear the girls running around upstairs and something breaking. When she confronts them Maggie tells Lisa it wasn't them it was Libby's imaginary friend that lives in the closet, Nate. Libby is angry for her sister bringing up her friend, but warns Lisa that she needs to leave because Nate doesn't like visitors.

Lisa continues to try to get the girls to go to sleep, but eventually when she returns to the girls' room they have locked the door and won't answer. Lisa decides this is enough, and tries to call the parents, but no one answers.

Determined to get the girls to bed, she finds a blueprint of the house and figures out a way to get in their room. Once there she discovers an elevator behind a large poster and heads to the basement to find the girls. What she finds looks like an abandoned medical facility. When she leaves the elevator she is hit in the head and knocked out.

Lisa wakes up in decrepit operating room handcuffed and strapped to a gurney. She frees herself then heads to find her way back out. While searching for a way to escape she finds out "Nate" is actually Dr. Nate Haken, the Hookman from the first game who has been living in the underground remains of the Stillwater Sanatorium. In the course of exploring the underground complex she learns that he has been trying to find a cure for "the disease of death". When the family moved into the house above him, he because attached to the young girl Libby, as his daughter would have been her age if she was still alive.

Libby dies after falling down the stairs and Dr. Haken revives her was his serum. But instead of restoring her completely, it turns her into a zombie version of herself, hence the "skin disease" mentioned by the mother. Since then he has been continuing to experiment on Libby, and needs to give her one final dose to complete her treatment.

Eventually Lisa discovers a way out and the last bit of Dr. Haken's serum. But as she is about to return to the main house, Dr. Haken returns and chases her through the complex. She manages to escape but finds the elevator shaft is empty. She tricks the doctor into looking into the shaft, then pushes him into it killing him.

Lisa returns to the house without Libby, as the girl is now trapped in a different part of the underground and doomed to eminently die from her disease. Instead she hopes to escape with Maggie. But when she finds the girl at the top of the stairs, Maggie pushes her to her death. Lisa wakes up once again chained in the basement. This time Maggie is her captor, has found the serum, and injected it into Lisa, turning Lisa into a zombie.

The story ends with the girls around the campfire asking if the story was real. One asks if she, the narrator, is supposed to be Maggie from the story. The narrator smiles and the camera pans away.

The game was released on October 21, 2010.

Campfire Legends: The Last Act

The game opens with a woman in a patient's smock with deteriorating skin walking out of an abandoned house. She walks onto a road in the middle of the woods and stands facing a set of headlights as they get closer.

When the game begins, the women from the first two games are still sitting around the campfire. The narrator asks if they want another story. The women seem hesitant, until the narrator offers them some hot chocolate from an old family recipe.

The scene shifts to Ashley and Reggie in a car driving to the campsite to scare their friends. But Reggie is distracted because he older sister Lisa disappeared in the same area years before. As they are talking the woman from the opening appears in their headlights and Ashley crashes the car to avoid hitting her. When Reggie wakes up, she finds the car totaled and Ashley gone.

After freeing herself from the wreck, Reggie decides to look for Ashley in the abandoned house across the street. After searching the house she finds Ashley who has discovered a partial journal written by Lisa. Reggie is shocked and the two girls decide to search the house to find the missing pages. As Reggie explores, she keeps seeing flashes of the woman from the road. Lisa's journal reveals she was taken prisoner and tortured by the "Monster of the Stillwater Sanatorium", which is located beneath the house. Lisa says the thought of Reggie being alive and out in the world keeps her sane, and even though it's too late for her, she is going to find a way out just in case Reggie ever gets trapped there. The journal entries say to stay away because the Monster doesn't only keep Lisa imprisoned, she captures other women, experiments on them and then they disappear.

Reggie finds a secret staircase to the basement and is chased down by the woman from the road. She locks the woman upstairs and searches for a different way out of the basement. While exploring she finds a video room with cameras showing feeds from all over the house and the nearby campground. When she checks the campground feed she sees her friends unconscious around the fire, and someone off screen pulling one of them into the woods. She then finds Ashely on a different camera just before Ashley is attacked by an unseen being.

Reggie manages to get the exit open, but is discovered by the woman from the road who corners her. The woman is the ghost of Lisa. The Monster had discovered Lisa's plans for escape and let her rot in a cell till she died. Lisa's ghost tells Reggie the only way her soul can find peace is if the cycle of kidnapped and tortured women ends. Reggie promises to help then escapes the basement and goes off looking for her friends.

The escape door leads to the basement of the cabin from the first game where she finds one of her friends, Zoe, tied up. Reggie escapes the basement, but Zoe stays behind as she is too scared to continue. With the guidance of more of Lisa's journal entries, Reggie find her friends trapped in the crypt from the first game. She also discovers the identity of the Monster: Maggie, the little girl from the first game and the narrator of the stories. Reggie manages to free her friends, but they are met with Maggie who now has a gun. Reggie manages to signal Zoe, who distracts Maggie enough for Reggie to knock the gun away. Reggie chases Maggie back into the basement of the cabin, knowing if Maggie escapes, Lisa's ghost will never be free. Maggie attacks Reggie, but Reggie manages to push Maggie over and she falls onto a tray of serum needles. The high dose kills her instantly, after turning her body into a zombie.

Lisa's ghost reappears and gives Reggie her necklace, then is transformed back into her old self and disappears in a flash of golden light. The last shot is of the empty campground as the fire slowly goes out and its smoke streams up to the starry night sky.

The game was released on October 27, 2011.

External links 
 Campfire Legends - The Hookman on GameHouse
 http://www.gamezebo.com/2009/10/14/campfire-legends-hookman-review/
 http://www.gamezebo.com/2010/10/21/campfire-legends-babysitter-review/
 http://www.gamezebo.com/2011/10/27/campfire-legends-last-act-review/

Video games developed in the Netherlands
Video games featuring female protagonists
Windows games
Windows-only games
2009 video games
RealNetworks
Hidden object games